The 19th Algerian Parachute Battalion (Fr: 19e bataillon de parachutistes algériens) was a French paratroop battalion formed in French Algeria in 1950. The battalion was disbanded in 1956.

References 

Parachute infantry battalions of France
Military units and formations established in 1950
Military units and formations disestablished in 1956